Stan Tekiela is a naturalist, author and wildlife photographer with a Bachelor of Science degree in Natural History from the University of Minnesota. He has been an active professional naturalist for more than 25 years and is a member of the Minnesota Ornithologists' Union, the North American Nature Photography Association, and Canon Professional Services. Stan studies and photographs wildlife throughout the United States, and has received various national and regional awards for his books and photographs. A columnist and radio personality, his syndicated column appears in more than 25 newspapers and he can be heard on a number of Midwest radio stations. He has made various books from birds, mammals, trees, wildflowers, amphibians and reptiles of some many different states from Minnesota to Texas to Florida.

References

External links
Stan Tekiela's personal website

Living people
Date of birth missing (living people)
University of Minnesota alumni
Writers from Minnesota
Nature photographers
Year of birth missing (living people)